Mazahr Makatemele (1846-1903) was an Afro-Swedish domestic. She was a local profile in the history of Kalmar and is known as one of the first Afro-Swedish women whose life is documented.

She was born in Natal in South Africa, and reportedly belonged to the Tswana- or Sotho people. She was enslaved by the Boers in 1857 or 1858. She eventually became the domestic of the Swedish businessman Alarik Forssman, who was visiting South Africa with his family. She was employed as a free servant and nursemaid by the Forssman family. In 1862, she travelled to Kalmar in Sweden with the Forssman family. She was taken care of by the Swedish Missionary Society and converted to Christianity. The conversion attracted attention and gave her good publicity. From 1864, she was employed as a maidservant by Cecilia Fryxell in her girls' school.

References

Further reading 
  

1846 births
1903 deaths
19th-century Swedish women
African slaves